Sidi Boubker is a small town and rural commune in Rehamna Province, Morocco. At the time of the 2004 census, the commune had a total population of 6398 people living in 926 households.

References

Populated places in Rehamna Province
Rural communes of Marrakesh-Safi